Cnemaspis niyomwanae, also known as Niyomwan's rock gecko,  is a species of gecko found in northeastern Thailand and western Cambodia.

References

nigridia
Reptiles described in 2010
Taxa named by Kirati Kunya